Xammar is a surname. Notable people with the surname include:

Eugeni Xammar (1888–1973), Spanish journalist, diplomat, and translator
Jordi Xammar (born 1993), Spanish sailor

See also
 Xamarin
 Xamaro
 Zammar